HMS Nadder was a River-class frigate of the Royal Navy during the Second World War. She was transferred to the Royal Indian Navy in 1945 and renamed Shamsher.

Construction
HMS Nadder was built by Smiths Dock Co., Ltd., South Bank-on-Tees in 1943. Nadder was powered by two Admiralty 3-drum type boilers providing a top speed of 20 knots and carried a complement of 118. She was armed with two 4 inch dual-purpose guns and eight 20 mm anti-aircraft guns. She also carried one Anti-Submarine Projector, known as a Hedgehog, and two slides to launch depth charges.

War service
On 10 April 1944 Nadder joined as an escort to Convoy UGS 37 through the Straits of Gibraltar. The convoy came under heavy dive bomber and torpedo attack. One ship was damaged during the encounter. But the escorts did keep German submarines U-421, U-471 and U-969 at bay.

In April 1944 Nadder was involved with the Greek Naval Mutiny, and captured the corvette Apostolis.

On 12 August 1944 Nadder took part in the sinking of U-198 near the Seychelles, in position . On 10 September 1944 Nadder rescued survivors from a U-boat attack on the British merchant . Carrying coconut oil, tea and copra for the Ministry of Food, Troilus was homeward bound from Colombo. She was sailing independently via Suez but was torpedoed and sunk by U-859 300 miles north east of Socotra Island on 1 September 1944.  and Nadder were sent to search for survivors. On 10 September they rescued 95 survivors of the attack and landed them at Aden 10 days later.

On 7 August 1945 Nadder was involved in an OSS operation off the west coast of Sumatra. The National Archives have an admiralty document reference ADM 1/30567 mentioning awards to three of Nadders ratings of Nadder for services during search for a missing OSS team on the west coast of Sumatra 7–11 August 1945 (Operation CAPRICE V). Temporary Acting Lieutenant-Commander Kitto is mentioned in despatches along with Engine Room Artificer Third Class Quintrell and Petty Officer Eustis "for bravery, skill and determination whilst serving in Nadder, in successfully beating off an enemy air attack on 10 August 1945, whilst engaged in a special operation many hundreds of miles from any supporting force".

Reports from veteran Nadder crew members indicate that the ship may have been one of the last ships to be bombed after the atomic bombings of Hiroshima and Nagasaki.

Post-war service

In 1945, Nadder was transferred into Royal Indian Navy and renamed HMIS Shamsher. In February 1946, the Indian Navy mutinied. Shamsher was the only ship in Bombay not to mutiny.  Shamsher was underway at sea during the mutiny, however, her commanding officer, Lt. N. Krishnan, submitted testimony to the Commission of Inquiry stating that the fact that the ship's officers were primarily of Indian origin, unlike many ships of the RIN, may also have been a reason for the ratings not joining the mutiny. From there she passed to the Pakistani Navy in 1947 being used as a training ship. She was eventually sold for breaking up on 2 March 1959.

References

Publications

External links
 Reference in Tempest, Fire And Foe by Lewis M. Andrews (1999)
 HMS Nadder (K392) at U-boat.net
 River class frigates at Battleships-cruisers.co.uk
  Possible OSS mission including reference to being bombed from Anthropological Intelligence: The Deployment and Neglect of American Anthropology in the Second World War by David H. Price (2008)
 "Mutiny in Alexandria" from TIME, May 1, 1944

 

1943 ships
River-class frigates of the Royal Navy
Ships built on the River Tees
Royal Navy ship names
India–Pakistan military relations
Training ships of the Pakistan Navy